Johnson Siding is an unincorporated community in Pennington County, South Dakota, United States. The population as of the 2020 census was 614. It is located in the Rimrock Area, approximately 10 miles west of Rapid City. Johnson Siding is surrounded by the Black Hills National Forest. It is the only significant business district in the Rimrock Area, with a gas station/general store, deli, casino, tavern, the Johnson Siding Volunteer Fire Department firehouse, the Rimrock Evangelical Free Church meetinghouse, and a community center. However, most inhabitants work in Rapid City or Deadwood.

Johnson Siding is named for a siding on the old Rapid City, Black Hills and Western Railroad (the Crouch Line) which ran up Rapid Creek between Rapid City and the Black Hills Highline at Mystic, which was originally constructed to serve the Johnson Sawmill, located a short distance upstream from the existing town. Many bikers attending the Sturgis Motorcycle Rally traditionally make at least one visit to Johnson Siding during Rally Week.

Johnson Siding is located on South Dakota Highway 44 at the intersection of Norris Peak Road, a paved county road, which connects the Rapid Creek valley with the Box Elder Creek valley, and Nemo Road to the north.

Johnson Siding has been assigned the ZIP code 57702.

Johnson Siding was the site of the political convention which first organized the South Dakota Libertarian Party in 1992, at which Costas "Gus" Hercules was nominated to the U.S. Senate. Johnson's Mill was also the head of the Hisega Flume, a wooden waterway constructed high on the south cliffs of the Rapid Creek canyon to supply a small hydroelectric plant at Big Bend near present-day Thunderhead Falls in the early 1900s, one of several National Engineering Landmarks in the Black Hills, which is now a popular bed and breakfast. This small Dakota Power plant delivered electricity to Rapid City until the community's needs out-grew the plant's capacity. It was shut down in the late 1930s. Dakota Power became a part of Black Hills Power and Light, eventually becoming  Black Hills Corporation. A few remnants of the flume are still visible high on the south side of the canyon at the big curve of SD Highway 44 before one gets to Johnson Siding.

To reach Johnson Siding, take US-385 north from Mill City past Sheridan Lake and Pactola Lake and turn east on SD-44 at Pactola Junction and go five miles; or take SD-44 (Jackson Boulevard) southwest from Rapid City.

References

External links
 Google map of Johnson Siding
 

Unincorporated communities in South Dakota
Rapid City, South Dakota metropolitan area
Unincorporated communities in Pennington County, South Dakota